Bergvik, Ekerö kommun, is a village (smaller locality) in Ekerö Municipality, Stockholm County, southeastern Sweden. According to the 2005 census it had a population of 92 people.

References

Populated places in Ekerö Municipality
Uppland